Crassispira lyopleura is an extinct species of sea snail, a marine gastropod mollusk in the family Pseudomelatomidae, the turrids and allies.

Description
The length of the shell attains 17 mm.

Distribution
Fossils have been found in  Oligocene strata in Mississippi, USA

References

External links
 Fossilshells.nl: Crassispira lyopleura

lyopleura
Gastropods described in 1984